Rocky Ford is a town in Screven County, Georgia, United States. The population was 167 at the 2020 census.

History
The community was named after a rocky ford over the nearby Ogeechee River.

Geography
Rocky Ford is located at  (32.664231, -81.828224).

Demographics

As of the census of 2000, there were 186 people, 78 households, and 53 families residing in the town. The racial makeup of the town was 68.28% White and 31.72% African American.

There were 78 households, out of which 23.1% had children under the age of 18 living with them, 52.6% were married couples living together, 14.1% had a female householder with no husband present, and 30.8% were non-families. 29.5% of all households were made up of individuals, and 21.8% had someone living alone who was 65 years of age or older.  The average household size was 2.38 and the average family size was 2.94.

In the town, the population was spread out, with 21.5% under the age of 18, 5.9% from 18 to 24, 23.1% from 25 to 44, 28.5% from 45 to 64, and 21.0% who were 65 years of age or older.  The median age was 44 years. For every 100 females, there were 84.2 males.  For every 100 females age 18 and over, there were 80.2 males.

The median income for a household in the town was $25,000, and the median income for a family was $28,750. Males had a median income of $28,125 versus $21,719 for females. The per capita income for the town was $12,989.  About 4.2% of families and 9.3% of the population were below the poverty line, including 18.8% of those under the age of eighteen and 10.5% of those 65 or over.

See also

 List of towns in Georgia (U.S. state)

References

External links

Towns in Screven County, Georgia
Towns in Georgia (U.S. state)